Ras al-Helal (Raʾs al-Helal, "Crescent Cape") is a village on the southern shore of the Mediterranean Sea in Derna District, Cyrenaica, Libya. It takes its name from its cape, which appears to have a crescent shape when viewed from the surrounding Jebel Akhdar foothills. It had a population totaling 2,235 in 2006. Ras al-Helal is known for its green, forested beach and its nearby waterfalls.

Geography
Ras al-Helal is the southwest endpoint of the Levantine Sea in the eastern Mediterranean. It is located in Cyrenaica  to the north-east of Bayda.

Beach 
Being one of the few exceptions, Ras al-Helal attracts many vacationers. The area is isolated because of the lack of a direct coastal road connecting the nearby western town of Susa with Benghazi, the country's second largest city and the largest city on the Cyrenaica coast.

Waterfalls

They are considered one of the most beautiful natural places in the country and attract many Libyan visitors and vacationers. The access road to the waterfalls, constructed during the Italian occupation, is old, narrow, and in poor condition. Some viewing locations for the waterfalls are along dangerous cliffs, so visiting alone is not safe.

See also
Geography of the Levantine Sea

References

Populated places in Derna District
Jebel Akhdar (Libya)
Cyrenaica